The 1996 season in Swedish football, starting January 1996 and ending December 1996:

Honours

Official titles

Competitions

Promotions, relegations and qualifications

Promotions

League transfers

Relegations

International qualifications

Domestic results

Allsvenskan 1996

Allsvenskan qualification play-off 1996

Division 1 Norra 1996

Division 1 Södra 1996

Division 1 qualification play-off 1996 
1st round

2nd round

Svenska Cupen 1995–96 
Final

National team results

Notes

References 
Print

Online

 
Seasons in Swedish football